Inner West Council is a local government area located in the inner western region of Sydney in the state of New South Wales, Australia. The council makes up the eastern part of this wider region, and was formed on 12 May 2016 from the merger of the former Ashfield, Leichhardt and Marrickville councils.

The mayor of Inner West Council is Darcy Byrne, elected by the councillors on 29 December 2021. An election on 4 December resulted in a Labor majority.

History
In the early 2010s, the New South Wales Government explored merging various local government areas to create larger councils within Sydney. In 2013, the Independent Local Government Review Panel (ILGRP) initially proposed a merger of the six inner west councils - Burwood, Strathfield, Canada Bay, Ashfield, Leichhardt and Marrickville, into a single council that would govern almost all of the inner west region. Alternative mergers were also proposed, such as one between Auburn, Burwood and Canada Bay, or between Burwood, Canada Bay, Strathfield and Ashfield. On 12 May 2016, Ashfield Council, Marrickville Council and the Municipality of Leichhardt merged to form the Inner West Council.

Proposed de-amalgamation
In December 2021, a majority of voters in Inner West Council voted in favour of reversing the 2016 merger and separating the three pre-existing councils of Ashfield, Leichhardt and Marrickville. The final declared results were: 62.49% YES and 37.51% NO.

In 2022, the council began preparing a business case for de-amalgamation.

Suburbs and localities in the local government area
 are:

Demographics
Aboriginal and Torres Strait Islander people made up 1.1 per cent of the population; significantly below the NSW and Australian averages of 2.9 and 2.8 per cent respectively. The median age of people in Inner West Council was 36 years; slightly lower than the national median of 38 years. Children aged 0 – 14 years made up 15.3 per cent of the population and people aged 65 years and over made up 12.25 per cent of the population. Of people in the area aged 15 years and over, 38.7 per cent were married and 10.8 per cent were either divorced or separated.

At the 2016 census, the proportion of residents in the Inner West local government area who stated their ancestry as Australian or from Britain and Ireland exceeded 54 per cent of all residents. In excess of 51 per cent of all residents in Inner West Council nominated a no religious affiliation at the 2016 census, which was in excess of the national average of 40 per cent. Meanwhile, as at the census date, compared to the national average, households in the Inner West local government area had a higher than average proportion (31.4 per cent) where two or more languages are spoken (national average was 22.2 per cent); and a lower proportion (64.4 per cent) where English only was spoken at home (national average was 72.7 per cent).

Council
The Inner West Council comprises fifteen Councillors elected proportionally, with three Councillors elected in five wards. On 9 September 2017, the current council was elected for a fixed three-year term of office (which was extended for twelve months in 2020 and to December 2021 due to the COVID-19 pandemic); The mayor is appointed biennially and deputy mayor annually by the councillors at the first meeting of the council.

Officeholders

Current composition
The most recent election was held on 4 December 2021, and the makeup of the council by order of election, is as follows:

Independents Victor Macri and Vittoria Raciti, the latter of whom formerly sat as a Liberal, both requested recounts in their respective wards. The NSW Electoral Commission denied these requests.

Town halls

The Inner West Council owns and maintains the three seats of the three pre-merger councils, being Ashfield Town Hall, Petersham Town Hall and Leichhardt Town Hall. In addition, the Council also owns the Marrickville, Balmain and St Peters town halls, which were the seats of municipal councils that had existed prior to their merger into the immediate predecessor councils.

Culture

Inner West Library Service

The Inner West Library Service consists of a network of 8 libraries located within the Inner West Council boundaries. After the Inner West Council amalgamation, a new library management system was launched on 1 March 2019, with a soft launch in late February allowing members to borrow from all libraries in the service.

The libraries of the Inner West Library Service include:
Ashfield Library
Balmain Library
Emmanuel Tsardoulias Community Dulwich Hill Library
Haberfield Library
Leichhardt Library
Marrickville Library
Stanmore Library
St Peters/Sydenham Library

See also

 Local government areas of New South Wales

References

External links

 

 
2016 establishments in Australia
Local government areas in Sydney